The Qiyi Street Mosque is a mosque in Wuchang District, Wuhan, Hubei, China.

Architecture
The mosque complex covers an area of 2,300 m2 with a capacity of 500 worshippers.

Transportation
The mosque is accessible within walking distance south of Shouyi Road station of Wuhan Metro.

See also
 Islam in China
 List of mosques in China

References

Mosques in China
Religious buildings and structures in Wuhan